Kaya Köstepen (12 December 1934 – 29 June 2011) was a Turkish football player who played club football for Altay and Beşiktaş. He was born in Aydın. He also earned four caps for the Turkish national side.

Köstepen died on 29 June 2011 in Istanbul.

References

External links
Player profile at Turkish Football Federation
 Player profile at Weltfußball.de

1934 births
2011 deaths
Turkish footballers
Turkey international footballers
Altay S.K. footballers
Beşiktaş J.K. footballers
Association football midfielders
Beşiktaş J.K. managers
Turkish football managers
People from Aydın